John Porter may refer to:

Politicians
John Porter (Illinois politician) (1935–2022), Illinois politician, U.S. Representative
John Porter (MP for Bramber) (died 1599), MP for Bramber
John Porter (MP for Maldon) (died 1660), English lawyer and politician who sat in the House of Commons in 1640
John Porter (New York politician) (1790–1874), New York politician
John Porter (Pennsylvania politician) (fl. 1810s), Pennsylvania politician, U.S. Representative
John Porter (portreeve), 1390–94, Member of Parliament (MP) for Taunton
John Addison Porter (Secretary to the President) (1856–1900), first Secretary to the President
John Clinton Porter (1871–1959), California politician, mayor of Los Angeles
John K. Porter (1819–1892), American lawyer and politician from New York
John L. Porter (politician) (1828–1897), Wisconsin farmer and legislator
John W. Porter (1860–1941), Wisconsin politician

Sports
John Porter (horseman) (1838–1922), trainer in British Thoroughbred flat racing 
Jock Porter (John Adam Porter, 1894–1952), Scottish motorcycle racer
John Porter (ice hockey) (1904–1997), ice hockey player
John Porter (footballer, born 1961), Scottish footballer
John Porter (footballer, born 1886) (1886–?), English footballer

Musicians
John Porter (British-Polish musician) (born 1950), partner of Anita Lipnicka
John Porter (musician, born 1947), British guitarist, bassist, and producer

Others
John Porter (settler) (c. 1605–after 1674), founding settler of Portsmouth, Rhode Island
John Porter (bishop) (died 1819), Anglican bishop in Ireland
John Addison Porter (1822–1866), United States professor of chemistry
John L. Porter (1813–1893), American naval constructor
John Porter (sociologist) (1921–1979), Canadian sociologist
John Robert Porter (1953–2021), English billionaire businessman and philanthropist
John Scott Porter (1801–1880), Irish biblical scholar and Unitarian minister
John Reed Porter (1838–1923), Medal of Honor recipient

See also
Jack Porter (disambiguation)
Jon Porter (born 1955), US congressman from Nevada
John Porter Stakes, British flat horse race, named for the trainer 
John Porter-Porter (1855–1939), Northern Irish politician